Malinovka is a rural locality (a selo) and the administrative center of Malinovsky Selsoviet of Bureysky District, Amur Oblast, Russia. The population was 1,126 as of 2018. There are 25 streets.

Geography 
Malinovka is located on the right bank of the Bureya River, 4 km southwest of Novobureysky (the district's administrative centre) by road. Novobureysky is the nearest rural locality.

References 

Rural localities in Bureysky District